The 2016 RideLondon–Surrey Classic was the 5th edition of the London–Surrey Classic road bicycle race. The race took place on 31 July 2016. It was won by Belgian rider Tom Boonen.

Results

References

2016 in British sport
2016 in English sport
2016 sports events in London
2016 UCI Europe Tour
2016 RideLondon–Surrey Classic
July 2016 sports events in the United Kingdom
2016